The 1978 PGA Championship was the 60th PGA Championship, played August 3–6 at Oakmont Country Club in Oakmont, Pennsylvania, a suburb northeast of Pittsburgh. John Mahaffey won his only major championship in a sudden-death playoff over Jerry Pate and Tom Watson.

Watson led the tournament each day and held a five-shot lead after 54 holes, but he faltered on Sunday with a 73 (+2) in his best opportunity for a PGA Championship, the only major he has never won. Pate had a four-foot (1.3 m) putt for a par and the victory on the 72nd hole, but it lipped out. After opening with a four-over 75 on Thursday, Mahaffey rebounded to go 12-under for the next three rounds, including a five-under 66 in the final round to gain the seven strokes on Watson. He had a history of hard luck in majors: at the U.S. Open, he lost the 18-hole playoff in 1975 and was the 54-hole leader in 1976, won by tour rookie Pate. Mahaffey broke that streak when he birdied the second extra hole to win the playoff at Oakmont.
It was the second of three consecutive playoffs at the PGA Championship.

Like Arnold Palmer, Watson won numerous majors but never the PGA Championship, the only leg missing for a career grand slam. At this time he had won three of his eight majors; his next best finish at the PGA Championship came fifteen years later in 1993, placing fifth at Inverness. Pate finished in the top five for the third straight year (and would again the next year) but never won another major.

Jack Nicklaus, age 38, shot a 79 in the first round and missed the cut by five strokes in one of his worst performances in a major. Four-time champion Nicklaus was a pre-tournament favorite: in his previous majors at Oakmont (two U.S. Opens), he won in 1962, his first major and first win as a professional, and tied for fourth in the 1973. At the previous year's PGA Championship at Pebble Beach, he finished third, one stroke out of the playoff.

This was the eighth major held at Oakmont and its third PGA Championship; the previous two in 1922 and 1951 were match play events.

Course layout

Lengths of the course for previous major championships:

Before 1962, the 1st hole was played as a par 5.

Past champions in the field

Made the cut

Missed the cut 

Source:

Round summaries

First round
Thursday, August 3, 1978

Second round
Friday, August 4, 1978

Source:

Third round
Saturday, August 5, 1978

Source:

Final round
Sunday, August 6, 1978

Source:

Playoff
The sudden death playoff began on the front nine at hole #1, a par-4 which all three parred.After Watson and Pate could not birdie hole #2, Mahaffey sunk a  birdie putt to win the title.

References

External links

PGA.com – 1978 PGA Championship

PGA Championship
Golf in Pennsylvania
PGA Championship
PGA Championship
PGA Championship
PGA Championship